The Reed Case is a 1917 American silent drama film directed by Allen Holubar and starring Holubar, Louise Lovely and Fred Montague

Cast
 Allen Holubar as Jerry Brennon
 Louise Lovely as Helen Reed
 Alfred Allen as Bull Renfroy
 Fred Montague as Chief Grady
 George C. Pearce as Senator Reed 
 Sydney Deane as John Reed
 Nanine Wright as Mrs. John Reed
 Ernest Shields as Schuyler Hastings
 Ed Brady as 'Red'

References

Bibliography
 Robert B. Connelly. The Silents: Silent Feature Films, 1910-36, Volume 40, Issue 2. December Press, 1998.

External links
 

1917 films
1917 drama films
1910s English-language films
American silent feature films
Silent American drama films
American black-and-white films
Universal Pictures films
Films directed by Allen Holubar
1910s American films